The 2006 Crimean parliamentary election were held on 26 March 2006. These were the first elections to the Verkhovna Rada of Crimea, which were conducted on the proportional election system. In order to gain representation in the Parliament of the Autonomous Republic of Crimea, the party or bloc had to get at least 3% of the vote.

Results

|-
! style="background-color:#E9E9E9;text-align:left;vertical-align:top;" |Parties
! style="background-color:#E9E9E9;text-align:right;" |Votes
! style="background-color:#E9E9E9;text-align:right;" |%
! style="background-color:#E9E9E9;text-align:right;" |Mandates
|-
| style="text-align:left;" |Bloc "For Yanukovych!" (Блок "За Януковича!")
 Party of Regions
 Russian Bloc
| style="text-align:right;" |324,710
| style="text-align:right;" |32.55
| style="text-align:right;" |44
|-
| style="text-align:left;" |Soyuz (Союз)
| style="text-align:right;" |76,143
| style="text-align:right;" |7.63
| style="text-align:right;" |10
|-
| style="text-align:left;" |Electoral Bloc of Kunitsyn (Блок Куніцина)
People's Democratic Party
Democratic Party of Ukraine
Party of the State Neutrality of Ukraine
| style="text-align:right;" |75,391
| style="text-align:right;" |7.63
| style="text-align:right;" |10
|-
| style="text-align:left;" |Communist Party of Ukraine (Комуністична партія України)
| style="text-align:right;" |65,341
| style="text-align:right;" |6.55
| style="text-align:right;" |9
|-
| style="text-align:left;" |Qurultai-Rukh (Курултай-Рух)
| style="text-align:right;" |62,448
| style="text-align:right;" |6.26
| style="text-align:right;" |8
|-
| style="text-align:left;" |Yulia Tymoshenko Electoral Bloc (Блок Юлії Тимошенко)
Fatherland
Ukrainian Social Democratic Party
| style="text-align:right;" |60,153
| style="text-align:right;" |6.03
| style="text-align:right;" |8
|-
| style="text-align:left;" |People's Opposition Bloc of Natalia Vitrenko  (Блок Наталії Вітренко)
Progressive Socialist Party of Ukraine
Party "Rus'-Ukrainian Union"
| style="text-align:right;" |49,579
| style="text-align:right;" |4.97
| style="text-align:right;" |7
|-
| style="text-align:left;" |Opposition Bloc "Ne Tak" (Опозиційний блок "НЕ ТАК!")
Social Democratic Party of Ukraine (united)
Republican Party of Ukraine
Political Union "Women for the Future"
Political Party "All-Ukrainian Union Center"
| style="text-align:right;" |30,825
| style="text-align:right;" |3.09
| style="text-align:right;" |4
|-
| style="text-align:left;" |Lytvyn's People's Bloc (Народний блок Литвина)
People's Party
Party of All-Ukrainian Union of the Left "Justice"
Ukrainian Peasant Democratic Party
| style="text-align:right;" |19,153
| style="text-align:right;" |1.92
| style="text-align:right;" |-
|-
| style="text-align:left;" |Bloc Our Ukraine (Блок Наша Україна)
 6 parties
| style="text-align:right;" |12,369
| style="text-align:right;" |1.24
| style="text-align:right;" |-
|-
| style="text-align:left;" |Socialist Party of Ukraine (Соціалістична партія України)
| style="text-align:right;" |9,576
| style="text-align:right;" |0.96
| style="text-align:right;" |-
|-
| style="text-align:left;" |Pora! (ПОРА!)
| style="text-align:right;" |1,895
| style="text-align:right;" |0.19
| style="text-align:right;" |-
|-
| style="text-align:left;" |Against all
| style="text-align:right;" |33,569
| style="text-align:right;" |20.98
| style="text-align:right;" |-
|-
|style="text-align:left;background-color:#E9E9E9"|Total
|width="75" style="text-align:right;background-color:#E9E9E9"|997,575
|width="30" style="text-align:right;background-color:#E9E9E9"|100.0
|width="30" style="text-align:right;background-color:#E9E9E9"|100
|}

2010 majority coalition
On May 28, 2010 a majority coalition was formed between the Party of Regions, the Bloc of Vitrenko, the Soyuz Party, the Social Democratic Party of Ukraine (united), as well as members of the Block of Kunitsin and six independent deputies. Coalition consists of 68 deputies.

Note: The Opposition Electoral bloc "NOT SO!" really represents the Social Democratic Party of Ukraine (united) at the Crimean peninsula. In 2010 the bloc was known as the Solidarity. The People's Movement of Ukraine "Rukh" in Crimea is known as the Kurultai-Rukh. The Kunitsyn's bloc in the council is represented by a deputy faction of "Krym".

By the summer of 2010 the council consisted of 16 members that quit their respective blocs and are considered as independent: For Yanukovych! - 12, BYuT - 3, Vitrenko - 1.

References

External links 
 Election commission of Crym

Elections in Crimea
2006 elections in Ukraine
March 2006 events in Ukraine